Deadly Companion (also known as Double Negative) is a 1980 Canadian thriller film based on the novel The Three Roads by Ross Macdonald.

Plot
Michael Taylor, played by Michael Sarrazin, is tormented by his sheer lack of memory concerning the night his wife was found brutally killed. Michael's girlfriend Paula (Susan Clark) helps him attempt to make sense of it all. Anthony Perkins plays a blackmailer; Al Waxman, Maury Chaykin, Kenneth Welsh and Michael Ironside appear in minor roles.

Several cast members of the Canadian comedy show SCTV appear in this film, all playing small dramatic roles.  (Director George Bloomfield had directed SCTV from 1977 through 1979, and brought the cast into the fold.) 
John Candy, Joe Flaherty, Eugene Levy, Catherine O'Hara (her second film), and Dave Thomas (his film debut) all have minor or bit parts; of the SCTV players, only O'Hara is in more than one scene, and Levy is visible for less than five seconds.  A similar flock of SCTV cast members had small roles in Bloomfield's previous feature Nothing Personal, which was released just six weeks earlier than Deadly Companion.

Some later video releases of the film misleadingly give some or all of the SCTV cast top billing.  In the actual film credits, no SCTV member is billed higher than 11th.

Cast
 Michael Sarrazin as Michael Taylor
 Susan Clark as Paula West
 Anthony Perkins as Lawrence Miles
 Howard Duff as Lester Harlen
 Kate Reid as Mrs. Swanscutt
 Al Waxman as Dellassandro
 Elizabeth Shepherd as Frances
 Kenneth Welsh as Dr. Klifter
 John Candy as John
 Michael Ironside as Edgar

Production
A 1979 article in The Globe and Mail on the film's production revealed that the script process was chaotic, saying that the film was "directed by George Bloomfield from a script by three Toronto writers who have adapted a Ross McDonald novel. The cast is in turn adapting the work of the three writers. 'This is one of those things that's in progress,' Miss Clark says, plonking herself on the floor in the corridor, 'so it's a big question mark. The three writers seemed to be coming from three different places. We have improvised: the locations have stayed the same, and so has the intent of the individual scenes, but...'"

Bloomfield said that Anthony Perkins "had a ball" with his debauched character: "He brought a tremendous amount to it. I suspect that Tony was a person who had a very free-flowing fantasy life, which he drew on." Perkins came up with the idea of filming a sex scene with both characters wearing sunglasses in bed. Susan Clark said, "He was very alive and always able to find some quirk in the character. But the man himself was very private, very mischievous. He would throw a line one way in rehearsal — then do a different inflection to see if you were really listening during the take."

Reception
Spies and Sleuths called the movie "a muddle film that cannot untie its tangled skein of a plot, although a Perkins performance is always worth watching."

Starburst wrote, "This convoluted thriller is not without its merits (not least some clever dialogue and well observed performances by, among others, Anthony Perkins.) The trouble is, Bloomfield has not learned from the brilliant Point Blank that an oblique, difficult narrative can be gripping (even if one is only gradually aware of what's going on) — here the effect is wearingly muddlesome."

References

External links
 
 
 Deadly Companion/Double Negative on Allmovie

1980 films
1980 thriller films
Canadian thriller films
Films based on American novels
Films directed by George Bloomfield
English-language Canadian films
1980s English-language films
1980s Canadian films